
Year 184 (CLXXXIV) was a leap year starting on Wednesday (link will display the full calendar) of the Julian calendar. At the time, it was known as the Year of the Consulship of Eggius and Aelianus (or, less frequently, year 937 Ab urbe condita). The denomination 184 for this year has been used since the early medieval period, when the Anno Domini calendar era became the prevalent method in Europe for naming years.

Events 
 By place 
 China 
 The Yellow Turban Rebellion and Liang Province Rebellion break out in China.
 The Disasters of the Partisan Prohibitions ends.
 Zhang Jue leads the peasant revolt against Emperor Ling of Han of the Eastern Han Dynasty. Heading for the capital of Luoyang, his massive and undisciplined army (360,000 men), burns and destroys government offices and outposts.
 June – Ling of Han places his brother-in-law, He Jin, in command of the imperial army and sends them to attack the Yellow Turban rebels. 
 Winter – Zhang Jue dies of illness while his brothers Zhang Bao and Zhang Liang are killed in battles against Han imperial forces. The Yellow Turban rebels become scattered.
 Last (6th) year of Guanghe era and the start of Zhongping era of the Eastern Han dynasty.
 Korea 
 King Gogukcheon (Gaonanwu) of Goguryeo (Gaogouli) pushes Chinese armies all the way back to Liaodong.
 Beolhyu becomes king of Silla.

Births 
 Guo Nüwang, Chinese empress of the Cao Wei state (d. 235)
 Origen, Christian scholar and theologian (approximate date)

Deaths 
 June 6 – Qiao Xuan (or Gongzu), Chinese official (b. 110)
 Adalla of Silla, Korean ruler (House of Park)
 Zhang Jue, Chinese leader of the Yellow Turban Rebellion

References